Sameer Wankhede is an Indian officer of the Indian Revenue Service from 2008 batch. Until 2021, he worked as Zonal Director of the Narcotics Control Bureau (NCB). Prior to joining NCB, Sameer Wankhede worked with the National Investigation Agency and the Air Intelligence Unit.

Career

In 2013, it was reported that he received death threats allegedly from the drug mafia but he refused security cover after his seniors approached for it. Wankhede said the move could demoralise the force.

He also led the investigation of Cordelia drug case.

By 31 December 2021, Wankhede’s attachment period with the NCB expired.

On May 2022, Wankhede was transferred to Chennai.

Personal life
He is married to Marathi actress Kranti Redkar. He has a son from his first wife Dr. Shabana Qureshi.
He has twin daughters from his second marriage.

References 

Indian government officials
Living people

1979 births
People from Mumbai